Conerly House is located in Alexandria, Louisiana.  It was added to the National Register of Historic Places on December 5, 1984. The house was relocated in 2004. It was subsequently delisted in 2015.

References

Houses completed in 1880
Houses in Alexandria, Louisiana
Former National Register of Historic Places in Louisiana
National Register of Historic Places in Rapides Parish, Louisiana